The International Federation of Women Lawyers (IFWL), in Spanish Federación Internacional de Abogadas (FIDA), is an international non-governmental organization (NGO) that enhances the status of women and children by providing legal aid, legal literacy and education programs, and through advocacy, law reform, research and publications.

History and activities

The International Federation of Women Lawyers (created in 1944) should not be confused with the International Federation of Female Lawyers and Judges (or Fédération internationale des femmes magistrats et avocats) founded in 1928 in Paris. According to the organization's history, 60 années d'histoire de la fédération international des femmes des carrières juridiques (Melun: FIFCJ, 1989), the federation was created by Vera Poska-Grünthal (Estonia), Clara Campoamor (Spain), Marcelle Kraemer-Bach (France), Agathe Dyvrande-Thévenin (France), and Margarete Berent (Germany). (Later sources say that Spanish politician and feminist lawyer Clara Campoamor and three other lawyers founded an earlier organization called the International Federation of Women Lawyers in Paris in 1928.)

The Federacion Internacional de Abogadas was established in 1944 in Mexico City. It obtained United Nations Consultative status in 1954.
It works with the United Nations Economic and Social Council (ECOSOC), United Nations Educational, Scientific and Cultural Organization (UNESCO) and the International Labour Organization (ILO).
FIDA publishes La Abogada Newsletter four times a year in Spanish and English, for members only.
Every two years FIDA publishes La Abogada Internacional in English, French and Spanish.

In 2011 UNESCO said of the organization: "The quality of the work of the IFWL, a professional organization whose geographical extension is fair and representativeness relatively balanced, is undoubted. Admitted to Category C in 1961, it has co-operated with UNESCO since 1953 in the context of the consultative arrangements. It received a financial contribution from UNESCO for organizing the international congress of lawyers (1989). Its co-operation with UNESCO, which is operational in nature, has slackened in the last few years.  It might consider drawing closer to NGOs that operate in similar fields."

Presidents 
Before 1960, Luisa A. Perez Peroso, and Rosalind Goodrich Bates both served terms as president of FIDA. (Note: The dates below reflect the conference each woman presided over; they were generally elected at the previous conference.)

Regional affiliates

As of 2011 there were affiliated organizations and individuals in 73 countries:
 Cameroon, Democratic Republic of the Congo, Egypt, Ghana, Kenya, Lesotho, Liberia, Nigeria, Senegal, Sierra Leone, South Africa, Sudan, Togo
 Argentina, Bermuda, Bolivia, Brazil, Canada, Chile, Colombia, Costa Rica, Dominica, Dominican Republic, Ecuador, Guatemala, Guyana, Honduras, Jamaica, Mexico, Netherlands Antilles, Panama, Paraguay, Peru, Trinidad and Tobago, Uruguay, United States of America, Venezuela
 Bangladesh, Hong Kong/China, India, Indonesia, Iran - Islamic Republic of, Israel, Japan, Republic of Korea, Lebanon, Malaysia, Pakistan, Philippines, Singapore, Sri Lanka, Taiwan/China, Thailand
 Australia, New Zealand
 Belgium, Cyprus, Denmark, Finland, France, Germany, Greece, Ireland, Italy, Luxembourg, Netherlands, Norway, Portugal, Spain, Sweden, Switzerland, Turkey, United Kingdom of Great Britain and Northern Ireland

Ghana

FIDA Ghana was founded in 1974. The association set up the first legal aid program in Ghana in 1985, mainly targeting indigent women and children. To help people understand the law, FIDA Ghana has developed booklets that present some of the existing laws affecting the status of women and children in simple English, and in translations into the Dagbani, Ewe, Ga, and Akan languages.

Kenya

FIDA Kenya was formed in 1985 after the third United Nations World Conference on Women, which was held in Nairobi. FIDA Kenya was affiliated to the Federation International De Abogadas until 1993. As of 2011 FIDA Kenya had over 600 members.
FIDA Kenya prepared a "shadow report" on the Kenyan Government's 2007 report on the UN Convention on the Elimination of All Forms of Discrimination Against Women. The report questioned the accuracy of the government's report and raised concerns about lack of government commitment to the advancement of women.

Nigeria

FIDA-Nigeria was founded in May 1982 to promote the welfare of women and children and remove harmful laws.
It provides free legal services to women and children, provides education and publications to help explain the law, and runs seminars, workshops and conferences.

Pamphlets cover subjects such as juvenile delinquency, rights of women, forced and early marriages and the effects of female circumcision.

United States 
FIDA USA was re-established in September 2020. It publishes news, articles, and journal articles discussing the rights of women and children in the US. FIDA USA participates in conferences and events organized under the agenda of the United Nations.

References

Bar associations
Women's occupational organizations
International women's organizations